Shingbahura, also spelled Shingbaura, is a village (postcode 3883) in Chatkhil Upazila, Noakhali District, Chittagong Division, Bangladesh. Shingbahura is famous for many things. One is Arafat Rahman Bilas (born on 26 February 1998) a Social Worker and a Businessman. He is notable for his contribution to the people who don't get a delicious meal in their daily life. He is one of the Founding members and the current president of The Dawat Committee. It's a nonprofit organization. This Organization helps people to get a healthy and delicious meals in their daily life. 
He is also an honorary member of a non-profit organization called (the Human Service Association Shingbahura). Over the years this organization helped a lot of people who were in need. In these past recent years, Mr. Bilas helped the organization to manage a lot of blood donation campaigns in Noakhali.
H.S.A.S. is donating money, clothes, food, etc. to the poor people who are in need.

Shingbahura is also known for Safayet Sazzad, He is also a respected member of the H.S.A.S .

References

Populated places in Noakhali District
Villages in Noakhali District